Canoe Passage State Marine Park is an undeveloped 2,507 acre (1,015 ha) Alaska State Park on Hawkins Island. The state park is 8 miles west of Cordova. There is no road access to the island. Popular activities include boating, fishing, hunting, camping, and kayaking. The park is surrounded by forested uplands and  wetlands.

The park is home to several crucial habitat areas including otter haul-outs, seal haul-outs, and migratory bird paths. Harbor seal and Steller sea lion sites can be found on the rocks off the entrance on the north side of Hawkins Island.

See also 

 List of Alaska state parks

External links

References

National parks in Alaska
1990 establishments in Alaska